Mian Qaleh (also romanized as Mīān Qal‘eh and Mīyān Qal‘eh; also known as Estakhrī, Kūh-e Qal‘eh, Kūh-i-Qal‘eh, and Kūh Qal‘eh) is a village in Rudbal Rural District, in the Central District of Marvdasht County, Fars Province, Iran. At the 2006 census, its population was 431, in 103 families.

References 

Populated places in Marvdasht County